In Māori tradition, Te Hoiere was one of the great ocean-going, voyaging canoes that was used in the migrations that settled New Zealand. Ngāti Kuia tradition states that their founding tupuna Matua Hautere, a descendant of Kupe, came to Te Waipounamu in his waka Te Hoiere, guided by the kaitiaki (tribal guardian) Kaikaiawaro.

See also
List of Māori waka

References

Māori waka
Māori mythology